The 1912 Lehigh Brown and White football team was an American football team that represented Lehigh University as an independent during the 1912 college football season. In its first season under head coach Tom Keady, the team compiled a 9–2 record and outscored opponents by a total of 222 to 72. The team played its home games at Lehigh Field in Bethlehem, Pennsylvania.

Schedule

References

Lehigh
Lehigh Mountain Hawks football seasons
Lehigh football